Eddie Wade (born 2 June 1948) is an Irish former Fianna Fáil politician. He was a Teachta Dála (TD) for the Limerick East constituency. Wade stood for election in Limerick East at the 1989 and 1992 general elections; on his third attempt, at the 1997 general election, he finally gained a seat in Dáil Éireann. However his fortunes were reversed again at the 2002 general election when he lost his seat to party colleague Peter Power.

Wade was first elected as a member of Limerick County Council in 1979 for the Castleconnell area, and retained his seat at the elections of 1985, 1991, 1999, 2004 and 2009. During that period, he was elected Cathaoirleach (chairman) of the Council on several occasions and was a prominent member of the Association of County and City Councils.

Before becoming a full-time public representative, he worked as a sales representative.

Eddie Wade has lived all his life in Cahernorry, Drombanna, County Limerick and is a member of the local South Liberties GAA club. He also served for many years as vice-chairman of Limerick GAA County Board.

References

1948 births
Living people
Fianna Fáil TDs
Members of the 28th Dáil
Local councillors in County Limerick